CEPIC, from CEnter of the PICture industry (former: Coordination of European Agencies Press Stock Heritage), is  a registered European Economic interest Grouping (EEIG) and international umbrella organization. It representing the interests of 11 national Picture Associations in Europe and further individual Agencies in EU-Institutions and international organizations.

History 
CEPIC was founded in Berlin in 1993, where it still has its Head Office. In 1997, it received Observer Status at the World Intellectual Property Organization (WIPO). CEPIC was registered in Paris in 1999. In 2006 CEPIC became an associate member of International Press Telecommunications Council (IPTC). Until 2009 CEPIC was known as the Coordination of European Picture Agencies. The change of the name to Centre of the Picture Industry is a result of the advancement to a more global orientation of the organisation.

Structure 
Currently,  Picture Agencies with about  photographers are represented by CEPIC. Members of CEPIC are mainly small and medium-sized companies, national museums and archives, which promote professional photography and footage in Press, Culture and Illustration.
The 7 members of the CEPIC Committee are elected every 2 years by representatives of the 11 national Picture Associations.

Goals and Activities 
CEPIC promotes the exchange of information between Pictures Agencies from all over the world with its annual Congress, which takes place in another European city every year (see below). CEPIC stands for the defense of a balanced market. Contract templates and guidelines for good business relations between photographers, Picture Agencies and users are developed on a regular basis. Together with ICOMP, CEPIC works on the protection of competitive market conditions.

Another main issue is the protection of intellectual property and the payment of photographers. CEPIC speaks up for ethical codes and for the rights of photographers and Picture Agencies.

In 2009, CEPIC issued a critical statement on the US-American Google Book Settlement. This statement was submitted to the European Commission in cooperation with ICOMP, the German Book Trade Association (Börsenverein des Deutschen Buchhandels), the Internet Archive/Open Book Alliance and EBLIDA.

CEPIC is, furthermore, active in the discussion about so-called Orphan Works and supports a sector specific solution. To prevent pictures from becoming orphan works, CEPIC recommends the improvement of legal and technological means of protection.

Members 
The 11 national Associations are:

 Germany
 BVPA – Bundesverband der Pressebild-Agenturen und Bildarchive
 France	
 FNAPPI – Fédération Nationale des Agences de Presse Photos et Information
 SAPHIR – Syndicat National des Agences Photographiques d'Information et de Reportage
 SNAPIG – Syndicat National des Agences Photographiques d'Illustration Générale
 Netherlands	
 NL image
 Portugal	
 APAAI – Associaco Portuguesa das Agencias e Arquivos de Imagens
 Sweden	
 BLF – Bildleverantörernas Förening
 SBF – Svensk Bildbyraförening
 Switzerland
 SAB – Schweizerische Arbeitsgemeinschaft der Bild-Agenturen und-Archive
 Spain
 AEAPAF – Asociacion Empresarial de Agencias de Prensa y Archivos Fotograficos
 United Kingdom	
 BAPLA – British Association of Picture Libraries and Agencies

The individual picture agencies are from Andorra, Germany, Finland, France, United Kingdom, Ireland, Israel, Italy, Norway, Austria, Poland, Romania, Russia, Spain, Czech Republic, Turkey, Hungary and the United States.

Annual congress 
The annual CEPIC Congress is the largest picture agents event in the world. It brings together about  delegates and 400 companies from 52 countries of 5 continents. Experts present reports and discuss Image Copyright, Indexing and Internet marketing among other issus. Further subjects are the challenge of the New Media, the situation of the Picture Market, its constant changes, as well as new technologies and footage.

See also 
 GLAM

References

External links 
 Official Website

Metadata
News agencies based in Germany
Organizations established in 1993